"Creature" is a song by British YouTuber and rapper KSI from his third extended play (EP), Space (2017). The song was independently released for digital download and streaming as the lead single from the EP on 23 June 2017. An accompanying music video was released on 27 June 2017.

Background
In February 2017, KSI "blacked out" all of his YouTube and social media accounts, as well as deleting around 600 YouTube videos, worth over two billion views, and deleting all of his social media posts. On 23 February 2017, in an interview with DramaAlert, KSI explained his actions, confirming that he wasn't "promoting anything". He continued to say that he doesn't "care about the fame or the money" and he is "sick of trying to portray himself as a certain thing which he isn't", describing himself as being "a clown for many years". He confirmed that he would not be uploading to YouTube for the foreseeable future.

Speaking to GRM Daily in July 2017 about his break from YouTube, KSI said, "I feel like with the whole KSI thing, it was sick don't get me wrong, I've enjoyed making all these videos, entertaining people, making people laugh and all that. But it's kind of to the point where I've been there, done that, now I wanna do what I wanna do. I felt like an evolution was needed to prove to people that I can do what I feel is necessary in my life, and that was the same feeling with this whole Space EP. I just wanted it to be truthful. I want people to actually see how I was feeling from my eyes about what I was going through". He continued, "I think it was near the end of last year when I was doing a book, a movie, dropped an EP, lots of youtube videos, I was just doing so much it got to the point where I started getting stressed and it really started to hinder me. I started getting ill and everything. It was just a bit too much and I was like "yo, right now what do I wanna do with myself?""

Release and promotion
After taking a four month break from uploading to YouTube, on 23 June 2017, KSI uploaded a forty second-long snippet of "Creature" to his YouTube channel titled "It's been a while". "Creature" was independently released for digital download and streaming on the same day, followed by the release of the Space EP one week later on 30 June 2017.

Music video
The song's music video was uploaded to KSI's YouTube channel on 27 June 2017. It has received 25 million views. The video has a running time of 3 minutes and 30 seconds. The video was filmed in Ghana in May 2017.  The video is directed by Ghanaian director Gyo Gyimah. The video opens with KSI sat in a psychiatric hospital, wearing a straitjacket, and talking to a psychiatrist. The rest of the video comprises scenes of KSI trapped in a collapsing building, walking through a rainforest, and standing in a desert valley, before being charged at by a group of African tribespeople in the video's closing scene.

On 15 August 2017, KSI revealed during his YouTube vlog titled "I'm Getting Deported" that the scene of himself trapped in a collapsing building was originally a burning building with firefighters coming to his rescue. However, the intensity of the scene was toned-down due to the then-recent Grenfell Tower fire which happened on 14 June 2017, also delaying the release of the music video.

The music video's description says "For Alfie" in dedication to Alfie Jones, a 12 year-old fan of KSI who died in July 2017 as a result of a rare type of bone cancer called sarcoma. KSI and his brother Deji Olatunji had visited Alfie in June 2017 shortly before his death.

Credits and personnel
Credits adapted from Tidal.

 KSI – vocals, songwriting
 Sway – production, songwriting
 Zagor – production, songwriting
 Charlie Cook – production, songwriting
 DJ Turkish – mixing

Charts

Release history

Notes

References

2017 songs
2017 singles
KSI songs
Songs written by KSI
Songs written by Sway (musician)
RBC Records singles
BMG Rights Management singles